Zlatko Juričević (28 July 1958 – 24 November 2018) was a professional football goalkeeper who played in the former Yugoslavia and Turkey.

Club career 
Juričević started playing football for FK Rudar Prijedor in the Yugoslav Second League and later in the Yugoslav First League for NK Čelik Zenica. In the second half of the 1980s, he moved to Turkey where he played for Karşıyaka.

Personal life
He spent the last years of his life in Croatia, on the island of Brač.

References

External links 
 Football stats at forum.b92.net
 
 
  at zenicainfo.ba

1958 births
2018 deaths
Croats of Bosnia and Herzegovina
Sportspeople from Zenica
Association football goalkeepers
Yugoslav footballers
Bosnia and Herzegovina footballers
FK Rudar Prijedor players
NK Čelik Zenica players
Karşıyaka S.K. footballers
Yugoslav First League players
Süper Lig players
TFF First League players
Yugoslav expatriate footballers
Expatriate footballers in Turkey
Yugoslav expatriate sportspeople in Turkey
Place of death missing